The women's 100 metres event at the 2009 Summer Universiade was held on 7–8 July.

Medalists

Results

Heats
Qualification: First 3 of each heat (Q) and the next 6 fastest (q) qualified for the semifinals.

Wind:Heat 1: -0.9 m/s, Heat 2: +0.4 m/s, Heat 3: +0.8 m/s, Heat 4: -1.7 m/s, Heat 5: +0.8 m/s, Heat 6: -0.9 m/s

Semifinals
Qualification: First 2 of each semifinal (Q) and the next 2 fastest (q) qualified for the finals.

Wind:Heat 1: +0.2 m/s, Heat 2: +0.4 m/s, Heat 3: +0.5 m/s

Final
Wind: -0.3 m/s

References
Results (archived)

100
2009 in women's athletics
2009